La Symphonie fantastique is a 1942 French drama film by Christian-Jaque and produced by the German-controlled French film production company Continental Films. The film is based upon the life of the French composer Hector Berlioz. The title is taken from the five-movement programmatic Symphonie fantastique of 1830. The film lasts around 90 minutes and was first shown at the 'Normandie' cinema in Paris on 1 April 1942. The posters at the premiere contained the sub-title 'La Vie passionnée et glorieuse d'un génie' (which links with the quote from Hugo at the very end of the film).

The French Bibliothèque du film (BiFi) contains an earlier draft plan for the film which envisaged a less realistic, more fantastic treatment of the story, entitled La Symphonie du rêve, with Pierre Fresnay in the central role.

The cast included several members of the Comédie-Française (Barrault, Saint-Cyr, Seigner, Berthau, Delamare, Fonteney). Barrault took part in a BBC2 programme in 1969 on the centenary of the composer's death, as Berlioz again, and in the autobiographical Lélio, sequel to the symphony.
Shortly after the film was released, Goebbels, having learnt of it, was displeased, considering it too patriotic and determined to summon the German producer Alfred Greven to Berlin to remind him that the French should only have light and superficial new films – and not cultivate French nationalism.

Synopsis 
The film is biographical, telling the story of the life and artistic struggles of the French composer Hector Berlioz. Berlioz is shown as a recalcitrant medical student in an anatomy class dreaming of becoming a composer; at a demonstration during a performance at the Paris Opéra conducted by Habeneck; at supper with other young artists (Hugo, Janin, Dumas, Mérimée, Delacroix); and chasing after his future wife Harriet Smithson, after a performance of Hamlet. Also depicted are his life in a garret, while suffering from an illness due to an abscess in the throat; a visit from his mother who curses him; and the composition of the Symphonie fantastique. The film then shows his marital breakdown, the premiere of his opera Benvenuto Cellini, his travels throughout Europe, his second marriage to Marie Recio (called "Marie Martin" in the film), public acceptance in old age and reconciliation with his son.

The film makes a vivid recreation of important public sites: a lecture theatre at the Faculty of Medicine, backstage at the Théâtre de l'Odéon, the Paris Opera, Montmartre lanes as well as salons and cafés.

Cast 
 Jean-Louis Barrault: Hector Berlioz
 Renée Saint-Cyr: Marie Martin
 Lise Delamare: Harriet Smithson
 Jules Berry: Maurice Schlesinger
 Bernard Blier: Antoine Charbonnel, friend of Berlioz
 Gilbert Gil: Louis Berlioz (son)
 Julien Bertheau: Victor Hugo
 Catherine Fonteney: Berlioz’s mother
 Louis Seigner: François Antoine Habeneck
 Louis Salou: opera director 
 Georges Vitray: captain
 Jacques Dynam:
 Marcelle Monthil: Smithson’s dresser
 Mona Dol: a maid
 Maurice Schutz: Niccolò Paganini
 Pierre Magnier: anatomy lecturer
 Roland Armontel: Eugène Delacroix
 Jean Darcante: Prosper Mérimée
 René Fluet: Jules Janin
 Georges Gosset: Alexandre Dumas
 Joé Davray: a student
 Georges Lafon: Russian minister
 Martial Rèbe: Smithson’s coachman
 Noël Roquevert: policeman
 Lucien Coëdel: printer
 Michel Vitold: conductor
 Georges Mauloy: the dean

Music 
As well as the symphony, the music used in the film includes the Invitation to the Dance by Weber, Roméo et Juliette (during the scene where Berlioz and Smithson fall in love), a staged excerpt from the first act of Benvenuto Cellini, the Rákóczi March from La damnation de Faust and the Requiem.

References

DVD release
In 2003 the film was re-issued by René Chateau Video.

External links
 

1940s biographical films
1942 films
Films about classical music and musicians
Films about composers
French black-and-white films
Films directed by Christian-Jaque
Films set in France
French biographical films
Films set in the 19th century
Hector Berlioz
Cultural depictions of Victor Hugo
Cultural depictions of Niccolò Paganini
1940s French-language films
Continental Films films
1940s French films